Irina Alekseevna Zabiyaka (born 20 December 1982) is a Russian singer and lead vocalist, songwriter in the popular Russian group Chi-li. She is known for her deep contralto voice.

Background
Irina was born and brought up in the Ukrainian town of Kirovohrad (present day Kropyvnytskyi), by her Ukrainian mother. At the age of 1, she left there to live in the Russian city of Kaliningrad.

Irina's mother did not want to tell her daughter that her father had died, so made up a story that he was a Chilean revolutionary. The young Ira believed the story and was proud of who she believed her father to be, with this influence going onto later see her band named 'Chi-li'.

Private life
In January 2013 she gave birth to a son.

References

External links 

 Official Website

1982 births
Living people
21st-century Russian singers
Musicians from Kropyvnytskyi
Ukrainian emigrants to Russia
Russian contraltos
21st-century Russian women singers